Fitzmaurice "Ferdie" Thomas Drake Aston (18 September 1871 – 15 October 1926) was an English-born South African rugby union player. He was capped four times for South Africa, captaining them in three Tests.

Aston made his debut appearance for South Africa on 30 July 1896, when a British Isles team came to South Africa. The game was played in Port Elizabeth, and won by the British, eight points to nil. Aston was also captain on that day. He was capped again on 22 August, again as captain in Johannesburg at Wanderers, South Africa going down 17 to eight.

Aston captained South Africa again on 29 August against the British Isles in Kimberley, which South Africa also lost, three points to nine. He did not skipper the final game on 5 September in Cape Town at Newlands, though South Africa won this game, five to nil. He did not play for South Africa again after the tour.

Aston died in 1926.

See also
South African rugby union captains

External links
Ferdie Aston on the Springbok Rugby Hall of Fame

1871 births
1926 deaths
British emigrants to South Africa
English rugby union players
Golden Lions players
Rugby union players from Cheltenham
South Africa international rugby union players
South African rugby union players
Rugby union wings